K. M. Hamsa Kunju (14 May 1941 – 13 May 2021) was an Indian politician. As a member of the Indian Union Muslim League, he served in the Kerala Legislative Assembly and was its Deputy Speaker from 1982 to 1986.

References

1941 births
2021 deaths
Indian Union Muslim League politicians
Deputy Speakers of the Kerala Legislative Assembly